Macarostola zehntneri is a moth of the family Gracillariidae. It is known from Maharashtra, India; Java, Indonesia; and Malaysia.

It has a wingspan of 10 mm.

The larvae feed on Eugenia aquea, Eugenia cumini and Eugenia jambolana. They probably mine the leaves of their host plant.

References

Macarostola
Moths of Asia
Moths described in 1902